The Bayakoa Stakes is a Grade III American Thoroughbred horse race for fillies and mares that are four years old or older, over a distance of one and one-sixteenth miles on the dirt track held annually in February at Oaklawn Park in Hot Springs, Arkansas.  The event currently carries a purse of $250,000.

History
The race was inaugurated in 1992 and named in honor of U.S. Racing Hall of Fame inductee, Bayakoa who had won the 1989 Grade I Apple Blossom Handicap at Oaklawn Park.

In 1993 event was run over a longer distance of  miles and in 1995 the event was not held.

The event was upgraded to a Grade III event in 2015.

Records

Speed record: 
  miles – 1:14.68 - Really Polish  (1999)

Margins: 
  lengths – Don't Tell Sophia (2013)

Most wins by a jockey
 4 - Terry J. Thompson (2007, 2010, 2011, 2012)

Most wins by a trainer
 4 - Steven M. Asmussen (2003, 2006, 2017, 2019)

Winners

See also
List of American and Canadian Graded races

External links
 Oaklawn Park Media Guide 2021

References

Horse races in the United States
Flat horse races for four-year-old fillies
Grade 3 stakes races in the United States
Mile category horse races for fillies and mares
Horse races in Arkansas
Oaklawn Park
1992 establishments in Arkansas
Recurring sporting events established in 1992